The Law is a single British television crime drama film, directed by Juliet May, that first broadcast on ITV at 21:00 on 12 June 2002. The film, billed as the UK's first attempt at a Law & Order-style series, focuses on a single case first investigated by the police and then taken to court by the Crown Prosecution Service. Intended as the backdoor pilot for a potential series, The Law received poor reception from both viewers and critics alike; and subsequently a full series was never commissioned.

The film was shot throughout the summer of 2000 and was originally slated for broadcast on 1 September 2000; however, for reasons unknown, the film was shelved and not rescheduled for broadcast until over 18 months later. The film starred Douglas Hodge as Detective Inspector Jack Raleigh; who is partnered with Junior Detective Constable Stephen Connor, played by Joe McFadden. Amita Dhiri, Sharon Duce, Barbara Flynn and William Gaminara are also credited amongst the main cast. The film gathered 5.42 million viewers. The film has never been released on VHS or DVD.

Cast
 Douglas Hodge as Detective Inspector Jack Raleigh
 Joe McFadden as Detective Constable Stephen Connor
 Amita Dhiri as Helen Galloway
 Sharon Duce as Linda Farrer QC
 Barbara Flynn as Eleanor Kimborough
 William Gaminara as Alan Vine
 Sam Loggin as Anna Darmon
 Sarah Malin as Dawn Trent
 Nicola Redmond as Detective Chief Inspector Maria Denby

References

External links

2002 television films
2002 films
British crime drama films
Television shows produced by Thames Television
ITV television dramas
Television series by Fremantle (company)
Films shot in London
Films directed by Juliet May
2000s English-language films
2000s British films
British drama television films